Epigynopteryx langaria is a moth of the  family Geometridae. It is found in Congo.

References

Ennominae